José Joaquim de Lima e Silva Moniz de Aragão (15 May 1887 – 20 July 1974) was Brazilian ambassador to the United Kingdom, 1940–52. His wife was Dona Isabel Moniz de Aragao.

Philately
Moniz de Aragão was a noted philatelist who was added to the Roll of Distinguished Philatelists in 1949.

References

Signatories to the Roll of Distinguished Philatelists
1887 births
1974 deaths
Philatelists
Ambassadors of Brazil to the United Kingdom